Missira may refer to:

Missira, Kindia in Guinea
Missira, Labé in Guinea